Thullal is a 2007 Indian Tamil-language drama film written and directed by Praveen Gandhi starring himself, Sonika, and Gurleen Chopra. Dhina composed the film's music. Thullal was released on 19 July 2007 to poor reviews.

Plot
Seenu, with a group of friends, is a prankster, spoiled brat, and big-time womaniser. He is addicted to sex and has sex with various women at any cost. It is shown in the introduction scene where an eloped couple meets them for help and the friends pretend to help them and take away the bridegroom from the place. Jeeva seduces the woman and enjoys having sex with her. Seenu's parents know about his attitude. They have advised him numerous times, but he is stubborn and considered it as a challenge by winning women's trust into having sex.

One fine day, he witnesses a group of thugs misbehaving with a girl named Shruthika. He immediately gets tempted of her and plans to help her to have sex with her. When he bashed all of the thugs, Shruthika instantly falls for him. They become good friends. One day, Jeeva invites Shruthika home and seduces her, ending up with both of them having sex. After that incident, he ill-treats her and asks her to either go out of town or get her pregnancy aborted. She tearfully leaves out of town to Ooty.

Before that, in a parallel scene, Seenu witnesses Shruthika forced by a woman named Gayathiri to lodge a police complaint against the man who betrays her, but she, feeling insecure to be known this by others, takes a step back. Gayathiri abuses that guy through words unknowingly; the man is none other than Seenu. He is angry and wants to avenge this insult. He plans to marry her, and after their first night, plans to escape to Goa.

After numerous attempts, Gayathiri gets convinced by her guardian, a doctor, to marry Seenu. After numerous failed attempts to seduce her, in her house, he hatches out a plan and fixes a honeymoon plan to Ooty. There, he meets Shruthika, his ex-victim who is now a tourist guide there in Ooty. Seenu obeys his wife's instructions and pretends to be a loyal husband. Gayathiri, who knows Shruthika earlier, introduces her to Seenu. Now Gayathiri's condition is that to believe him or to start a life with him, he must resolve the pending problem in Shruthika's life. He apologises to Shruthika and promises to marry her and also tells her that he will reveal everything to his wife, but he cunningly plans to fool both his ex-lover and wife. His friend Muthu tries to reveal everything to his wife, but Seenu drugs him by mixing sleeping pills in the coffee that he drinks. Muthu ends up revealing everything to Shruthika and telling her to at least try to save Gayathiri.

Seenu successfully has sex with Gayathiri and drugs her by mixing sleeping pills in the milk, leaving her unconscious. When he was to about to escape to Goa in a bus, Shruthika captures him and brings him to a mortuary. Shruthika abuses him with words and says "You love to touch women's body. Now touch this bodies till you satisfy". He is horrified by this and realises his mistake and his life as an animal. He asks forgiveness and tries to commit suicide, which is stopped by Shruthika. Shruthika asks him to live a good life with Gayathiri as that is his lifelong punishment. Outside the mortuary, they tell the awaiting Gayathiri that her lover died in an accident. Seenu and Gayathiri are joined hands by Shruthika. Seenu and Shruthika see each other for the one last time and bid a tearful goodbye, whereas Shruthika leaves the country forever and settles in Australia.

Cast
Praveen Gandhi as Seenu
Gurleen Chopra as Shruthika
Sonika as Gayathiri, Seenu's wife
Vivek as Muthu, Seenu's friend
Seetha as Gayathiri's guardian and a doctor
Manikka Vinayagam as Seenu's father
Sumithra as Seenu's mother
N. Mathrubootham as Das/Giri/Chand/Pillai/3
Priyanka

Production
The film was first reported in June 2000, when Pravinkanth worked on the film alongside commitments of directing two other projects involving Prashanth and Ajith Kumar. The film was set to be produced by Anbalaya Films. In 2003, he began production on the film, in which he would play the central character and despite being launched amidst much fanfare, its theatrical release saw a delay. Chaya Singh was briefly attached to the project during 2003 before opting out.

Soundtrack
Soundtrack was composed by Dhina.

References

Films shot in Ooty
Indian romance films
2000s Tamil-language films
Films directed by Praveen Gandhi
2000s romance films